The Texas Chainsaw Massacre: The Beginning is a 2006 American slasher film and a prequel to the 2003 film. The sixth installment in The Texas Chainsaw Massacre franchise, it was written by Sheldon Turner from a story by Turner and David J. Schow, directed by Jonathan Liebesman and co-produced by Kim Henkel and Tobe Hooper (co-creators of the original 1974 film). The film's story takes place four years before its predecessor. It stars Jordana Brewster, Diora Baird, Taylor Handley, Matt Bomer and R. Lee Ermey.

Originally, the film had the subtitle The Origin. New Line Cinema had to pay $3.1 million more than expected in order to keep the rights to the franchise after Dimension Films made a large offer to buy it.

The Texas Chainsaw Massacre: The Beginning was released in North America on October 6, 2006. The film received negative reviews from critics but still grossed $51.8 million on a budget of $16 million, although this would be less than half the gross of the previous film.

Plot
In 1939, a woman dies while giving birth prematurely in a slaughterhouse in Texas, and the supervisor abandons the baby in a dumpster. When young Luda Mae Hewitt finds the child, she takes him back to the Hewitt residence, names him Thomas and raises him as her own son.

Thirty years later, Thomas (Andrew Bryniarski) works in the slaughterhouse under the same supervisor who left him in the dumpster. When the plant is shut down by the health department, he refuses to leave until the supervisor makes him. Thomas kills the supervisor with a hammer and finds a chainsaw, which he takes with him. When Sheriff Hoyt attempts to arrest him, Luda Mae's son, Charlie Hewitt (R. Lee Ermey) kills Hoyt and assumes his identity.

Meanwhile, brothers Eric (Matt Bomer) and Dean (Taylor Handley), are driving across the country with their girlfriends, Chrissie (Jordana Brewster) and Bailey (Diora Baird), to enlist in the Vietnam War. At a diner, they run into a biker gang, one of whom follows them on her motorcycle. She draws a shotgun and orders the group to pull over. In the ensuing chaos, the car crashes, and Chrissie is thrown into a field. When Hoyt arrives, he kills the biker and makes them put her body in his car. He then calls for Uncle Monty to tow the jeep, which Chrissie is hiding in.

Hoyt drives the group to the Hewitt house where he has Thomas butcher the biker's body. Chrissie runs to the highway and flags down Holden, the biker's boyfriend, and they return to the house together. Hoyt tortures Dean after finding out that he was going to forgo the Vietnam War draft. When Hoyt leaves, Eric breaks free from his restraints and gets Dean to safety before sneaking into the house to free Bailey. Bailey escapes in Monty's truck but Thomas stabs her with a meat hook and drags her back to the house. Dean gets caught in a bear trap, and Hoyt knocks Eric unconscious.

Holden and Chrissie part ways to search for their friends. While Chrissie finds Dean, Holden takes Hoyt hostage. Thomas straps Eric to a wooden table and slices off the nerves in both of his arms. Hoyt calls out to Thomas for help, and Thomas kills Holden with the chainsaw. Chrissie finds Eric in the basement but is unable to free him, and hides when Thomas returns. Thomas kills Eric with the chainsaw, then skins his face and wears it as a mask. Chrissie is about to flee when she hears Bailey's screams and decides to save her. She finds her upstairs, but Hoyt catches her and brings her downstairs for dinner, along with Bailey and an unconscious Dean. Leatherface slits Bailey's throat and tries to take Chrissie to the basement, but she stabs him in the back with a screwdriver, and jumps out of a window.

Dean regains consciousness and savagely beats Hoyt before heading off to find Chrissie. Chrissie enters the slaughterhouse, grabs a knife and cuts Leatherface's face, but he overpowers her. Dean intervenes but Leatherface kills him with the chainsaw. Chrissie escapes, hijacks an abandoned car, and drives off. She sees a state trooper and pulled over pedestrian, but as she pulls over, Leatherface appears in the backseat and impales her with the chainsaw, causing her to lose control and crash into the trooper and pedestrian. Leatherface walks along the road back towards the Hewitt house.

Cast

Production

Development
After the success of The Texas Chainsaw Massacre (2003), Platinum Dunes producers Andrew Form and Brad Fuller began brainstorming story ideas for another installment, deciding a prequel would allow for more narrative possibilities. They contacted Scott Kosar, who wrote the 2003 remake, but he was tied up with other projects, so they turned to Sheldon Turner, whom they worked with on The Amityville Horror (2005). The producers asked Turner to answer questions posed by the original Texas Chainsaw Massacre story concerning the Hewitt family.
 
Director Jonathan Liebesman was not certain about taking on the film until he learned that it was to be a prequel. He proposed not trying to explain too much of the killer's motives, and that "the movie needed to feel like the beginning of hell."

Filming
Principal photography began in Austin, Texas, at several of the same locations as the 2003 film. Liebesman asked for Lukas Ettlin as cinematographer, who had shot every student film Liebesman made. The filmmakers decided on a desaturated red, white and blue color theme, representing "the decay of the American dream, the family that's gone off the rails." The film was shot in chronological order, and after the depiction of the car crash, Ettlin changed the shutter angle from 180 to 90 degrees for the rest of the shoot to make everything appear more hectic.

Release

Box office
The Texas Chainsaw Massacre: The Beginning was released on October 6, 2006, in 2,820 theaters, debuting at number 2 at the box office, grossing $18,508,228 on its first weekend. Its second week saw a 59.6% drop in attendance, grossing only $7,485,290 and coming in at number 5 at the box office. During its third week it grossed $3,779,829 and came in at number 10 at the box office. The film dropped out of the top ten and into eighteenth place with $1,269,942. The Texas Chainsaw Massacre: The Beginning would fail to regain a top ten spot at the box office for the remainder of its theatrical run, ending with $51,764,406 in total gross.

Home media
The Texas Chainsaw Massacre: The Beginning was released on DVD by New Line Home Video on January 16, 2007. This release included both theatrical and unrated versions of the film, as well as a double feature with the first film. EIV would release the film in the UK on February 19 that same year as both a two-disc uncut edition, a single-disc theatrical version, and as a part of the Texas Chainsaw Massacre collection.
New Line would re-release the film in 2008 and 2009 before releasing the film on Blu-ray on October 15, 2013. The film had previously been released for the first time on Blu-ray by Ais on July 6, 2010.

Critical reception
On review aggregator website Rotten Tomatoes, it holds a 15% approval rating based on 88 reviews and an average rating of 3.80/10. The site's consensus states: "The Texas Chainsaw Massacre: The Beginning is full of blood and gore, but not enough scares or a coherent story to make for a successful horror film." Metacritic reports a 30 out of 100 rating, based on 18 critics, indicating "generally unfavorable reviews".

Peter Travers from Rolling Stone awarded the film zero stars, calling it "putridly written, directed and acted", also criticizing the film's "obvious" plot turns.
Nathan Lee from The New York Times panned the film as "an invitation to hard-core sadism". In a more positive review, Peter Debruge of Variety thought "Liebesman hews close to the 2003 pic's bile-tinged snuff film aesthetic ... Purists who wondered what had become of the family dinner scene (left out of the remake) should be pleased to find an even creepier version recreated here."

At the 27th Golden Raspberry Awards (2006), the film was nominated for a Worst Prequel or Sequel, but lost to Basic Instinct 2.

Cancelled sequel
In January 2007, Platinum Dunes executives Bradley Fuller and Andrew Form stated that the company would not be producing the third film in the Texas Chainsaw Massacre remake franchise.

References

External links
 

 

 

2006 horror films
2006 films
2000s slasher films
2000s serial killer films
American slasher films
2000s English-language films
Beginning, The
Films produced by Kim Henkel
Films set in 1939
Films set in 1969
Films set in Texas
Films shot in Austin, Texas
American serial killer films
Platinum Dunes films
Prequel films
Films scored by Steve Jablonsky
Films directed by Jonathan Liebesman
Films produced by Michael Bay
Films produced by Andrew Form
Films produced by Bradley Fuller
Films about deserters
2000s American films
American prequel films